Sular (also Romanized as Sūlār; also known as Solār and Sūlāv) is a village in Manzariyeh Rural District, in the Central District of Shahreza County, Isfahan Province, Iran. At the 2006 census, its population was 413, in 125 families.

References 

Populated places in Shahreza County